The 2009 Men's Hockey Asia Cup was the eighth edition of the Men's Hockey Asia Cup, the quadrennial international men's field hockey championship of Asia organized by the Asian Hockey Federation. It was held from May 9 to May 16, 2009 in Kuantan, Pahang, Malaysia.

The tournament was originally awarded to Dubai, United Arab Emirates by the Asian Hockey Federation (AHF) in a 2008 meeting. However, it was swapped to Malaysia due to the inability of the hockey facility to be complete in Dubai Sports City on time. The tournament is sponsored by AirAsia with MYR 500,000. South Korea won their third title and qualified for the 2010 World Cup in New Delhi, India, after defeating Pakistan 1–0 in the final.

Teams
Only eight teams were to compete in this tournament, divided by two pools. However, Sri Lanka withdrew from the tournament few days before the commencement, having replaced Oman before the withdrawal. Although the tournament is reduced to seven teams, the format of the competition remains unchanged.

Results
All times are local, MYT (UTC+8).

Preliminary round

Pool A

Pool B

Fifth to seventh place classification

Seventh place

Fifth and sixth place

First to fourth place classification

Semi-finals

Third and fourth place

Final

Statistics

Final standings

Awards

References

Hockey Asia Cup
A
A
2009
2009 in Asian sport
Asia Cup